North Arkansas Electric Cooperative is a non-profit rural electric utility cooperative headquartered in Salem, Arkansas, with district offices in Ash Flat and Mountain Home, Arkansas.

The Cooperative was organized in 1939 and the first power lines were energized in June 1940.

The Cooperative serves portions of seven counties in the state of Arkansas, in a territory generally located in north central Arkansas.

Currently (as of September 2005) the Cooperative has more than 4,500 miles of distribution lines, 25 substations and services 33,000 accounts.  It considers itself the fifth-largest rural electric cooperative in Arkansas.

External links
North Arkansas Electric Cooperative

Companies based in Arkansas
Electric cooperatives in Arkansas
Fulton County, Arkansas
1939 establishments in Arkansas
Companies established in 1939